This list of astronomy awards is an index to articles about notable awards for contributions to astronomy. The list is organized by region and country of the sponsoring organization, but awards are not necessarily limited to people from that country.

Americas

Asia

Europe

Oceania

See also

 Lists of awards
 Lists of science and technology awards

References

 
Astronomy